Harold A. Sackeim is an American psychologist and proponent of electroconvulsive therapy. He has been Chief of the Department of Biological Psychiatry at New York State Psychiatric Institute and Professor of Clinical Psychology in Psychiatry and Radiology at Columbia University.  He received his bachelor's degree from Columbia in 1972; in 1974, he received his master's degree from Oxford University; and in 1977 he received his Ph.D. from the University of Pennsylvania.

Sackeim is co-author of more than 300 publications relating to electroconvulsive therapy. Until 2007 all of his research expounded on its positive effects. For many years he denied that electroconvulsive therapy had any permanent or negative side effects, including memory loss, despite the many complaints of individuals who had undergone the procedure. Finally, in 2007, his research found that excessive electrical dosage correlated with the risk of memory loss. For many years during his research of electroconvulsive therapy, Sackheim consulted for MECTA and Somatics, companies that manufacture devices for its administration, constituting what many consider a conflict of interest.

In 2007, Sackeim and his colleagues published the results of a study which followed 250 patients who had received electroconvulsive therapy. The study found that the various techniques used when giving electroconvulsive therapy can have a direct impact on the adverse effects experienced by patients. Sackeim and colleagues later demonstrated that right unilateral electroconvulsive therapy with an ultra brief pulse appears to be the most efficacious, while remaining the least likely to cause adverse effects.

References

Year of birth missing (living people)
Living people
21st-century American psychologists
Columbia University alumni
Columbia University faculty
Alumni of the University of Oxford